"Saturday Night at the Movies" is a song written by Barry Mann and Cynthia Weil, and recorded by The Drifters from the United States with Johnny Moore as vocalist. The song was arranged and conducted by Teacho Wiltshire and produced by Bert Berns.

The song was released as a 1964 single, peaking at #18th position at the Billboard Hot 100. In the United Kingdom, the song peaked at #35.
The song charted again, in the United Kingdom in March 1972 when reissued as a double A-side with "At The Club" peaking at #3 at the UK Singles Chart.

Personnel 
The song was recorded on August 4, 1964 at Atlantic Studios in New York City.

 Johnny Moore, lead tenor vocal
 Charlie Thomas, tenor vocal
 Eugene Pearson, baritone vocal
 Johnny Terry, bass vocal
 Ernie Hayes, piano
 Everett Barksdale, guitar
 Bill Suyker, guitar
 Bob Bushnell, guitar
 Milt Hinton, bass
 Gary Chester, drums

Chart performance

Other versions
Inger Öst recorded the song with lyrics in Swedish by Green as På nian på lördag, releasing it as a single in January 1968, with Öppna ditt hjärta (Open Your Heart) acting as a B-side.
In 1991, a version was featured in the horror movie Popcorn by Ossie D and Stevie G.
In 1996, a version was featured as track 5 on the album Take Two, the second and final studio album by English pop-duo Robson and Jerome. It also features on both of the duo's compilation albums, titled "Happy Days - The Best Of" and "The Love Songs".
In 2002, the song was recorded by Swedish band Barbados on the album Världen utanför.
In 2008, Swedish band Drifters recorded the song on the album Tycker om dig: Svängiga låtar från förr.
In 2017, English singer Joe McElderry recorded the song on his #10 album, also titled Saturday Night at the Movies.

References 

1964 singles
The Drifters songs
Songs written by Barry Mann
Songs with lyrics by Cynthia Weil
1968 singles
Drifters (Swedish band) songs
Barbados (band) songs
1964 songs
Atlantic Records singles